Eurysquillidae is a family of mantis shrimp. Formerly placed in the superfamily Gonodactyloidea, it has since been recognised that eurysquillids are closer to families in the Squilloidea, and so Eurysquillidae has been placed in its own superfamily, Eurysquilloidea. It includes six genera and 30 species

Coronidopsis Hansen, 1926
 Coronidopsis bicuspis Hansen, 1926
 Coronidopsis serenei Moosa, 1973
Eurysquilla Manning, 1963a
 Eurysquilla chacei Manning, 1969
 Eurysquilla crosnieri Moosa, 1991
 Eurysquilla foresti Moosa, 1986
 Eurysquilla galatheae Manning, 1977
 Eurysquilla holthuisi Manning, 1969
 Eurysquilla leloeuffi Manning, 1977
 Eurysquilla maiaguesensis (Bigelow, 1901)
 Eurysquilla pacifica Manning, 1975
 Eurysquilla plumata (Bigelow, 1901)
 Eurysquilla pumae Hendrickx & Salgado-Barragán, 1987
 Eurysquilla sewelli (Chopra, 1939)
 Eurysquilla solari Manning, 1970
 Eurysquilla veleronis (Schmitt, 1940)
Eurysquilloides Manning, 1963a
 Eurysquilloides sibogae (Hansen, 1926)
Manningia Serène, 1962
 Manningia amabilis Holthuis, 1967
 Manningia andamanensis Ghosh, 1975
 Manningia arabica Manning, 1990
 Manningia australiensis Manning, 1970
 Manningia misool Ahyong, 1997
 Manningia notialis Manning, 1966
 Manningia pilaensis (de Man, 1888)
 Manningia posteli Manning, 1977
 Manningia raymondi Bruce, 1986
 Manningia wilsoni Ahyong, 2001
 Manningia zehntneri Manning, 1974
Raysquilla Ahyong, 2000
 Raysquilla manningi Ahyong, 2000
Sinosquilla Liu & Wang, 1978
 Sinosquilla hispida Liu & Wang, 1978
 Sinosquilla sinica Liu & Wang, 1978

References

Stomatopoda
Crustacean families
Crustaceans described in 1977
Taxa named by Raymond B. Manning